Warneckea memecyloides is a species of plant in the family Melastomataceae. It is found in Cameroon, Ivory Coast, Gabon, Ghana, and Nigeria. It is threatened by habitat loss.

References

memecyloides
Vulnerable plants
Taxonomy articles created by Polbot